Colton "Cole" Missimo (born February 15, 1993) is an American soccer player.

Career

Youth and college 
Missimo attended Prestonwood Christian Academy where he was the team captain as a freshman, sophomore and junior. He was twice named District Offensive Player of the Year in 2010 and 2011. He was also a two-time Texas First-Team All-State and three-time First Team All-District. In 2010, Missimo led Prestonwood to Texas (Private Schools) State Championship. He holds the Prestonwood record for goals in a season with 39, notching 71 goals for his career. He also notched 36 total assists during his sophomore and junior years. Missimo was an eight-year member of Solar Chelsea SC and played in the USSF Developmental Academy with Solar starting in 2009. Missimo played four years of college soccer at Northwestern University between 2012 and 2015. He logged 76 caps, 7 goals, and 12 assists as a member of the Wildcats.

Professional 
On January 19, 2016, Missimo was selected 64th overall in the 2016 MLS SuperDraft by Philadelphia Union.

He made his professional debut with Bethlehem Steel FC on April 3, 2016, starting in a 2–1 loss to FC Cincinnati.

References

External links 
 MLS player profile

1993 births
Living people
American soccer players
Association football midfielders
Philadelphia Union II players
Northwestern Wildcats men's soccer players
Reading United A.C. players
Philadelphia Union draft picks
Philadelphia Union players
Soccer players from Dallas
USL Championship players
USL League Two players